Bastian Winkelhaus is a German Star Wars Customizable Card Game player. He is the only 3-time world champion, and the only person to win the championship in consecutive years. He is best known for winning the 2001 SWCCG world championship at FreedomCon. The following year, he made the top eight at the world championships again. After a long hiatus from competitive play, Winkelhaus returned and won back-to-back world championships in 2018 and 2019.

Winkelhaus has also won the European Continental Championships four times. He was one of the three SWCCG players elected to the Decipher, Inc. Hall of Fame in 2002.

See also
 Star Wars Customizable Card Game

References

External links
 DeckTech.net - "The 20 Greatest and Most Influential Players in SWCCG History"

Living people
Year of birth missing (living people)